Juan Gabriel Concepción Zambrano (born 7 August 1972 in Bérriz, Vizcaya) is a retired Spanish pole vaulter.

He won the silver medal at the 1997 Mediterranean Games. He also competed at the 1996 Olympic Games without reaching the final.

His personal best jump was 5.70 metres, achieved in July 1996 in Barcelona.

References
sports-reference

1972 births
Living people
Spanish male pole vaulters
Athletes (track and field) at the 1996 Summer Olympics
Olympic athletes of Spain
Mediterranean Games silver medalists for Spain
Mediterranean Games medalists in athletics
Athletes (track and field) at the 1997 Mediterranean Games